Hofer may refer to:

Organizations 
 Hofer, the operating name of the supermarket chain Aldi in Austria and Slovenia
 Hofer Symphoniker (Hof Symphony Orchestra), a symphony orchestra based in Hof, Bavaria, Germany

People 
Hofer, from Höfer (yard, court), is a surname of German origin and may refer to:

Adolf Hofer (luger) (fl. 1950s), Austrian luger
Adolf Hofer (politician) (1868–1935), German politician (SPD)
Amalie Hofer, née Weissenrieder (1820–1872), German revolutionary and wife of Johann Hofer
Andreas Hofer (composer) (1629–1684), Austrian composer
Andreas Hofer (1767–1810), Tyrolean leader of the rebellion against the revolutionary Napoleonic invasion
Andreas Hofer (artist) (born 1963), German artist
Andreas Hofer (actor) (born 1969), German actor
Bruno Hofer (1861–1916), German fishery scientist, ichthyologist
David Hofer (born 1983), Italian cross-country skier
Dulce Ann Hofer (born 1967), member of Philippine House of Representatives from Zamboanga Sibugay 2nd District
Ernst Hofer (judoka) (born 1971), Austrian judoka
Ernst Hofer (racer), see 1926 German Grand Prix
Franz Hofer (director) (1882–1945), German movie director
Franz Hofer (1902–1975)
Franz Hofer (footballer) (born 1918), Austrian footballer
Gustav Hofer (born 1976), Italian TV journalist
Helmut Hofer (born 1956), German mathematician
Helmut Otto Hofer (1912-1989), Austrian zoologist and anatomist
Hermann Hofer (1934–1996), German football player
Jan Hofer (1952), German journalist and television presenter
Johann Hofer (1810–1880), German lawyer and revolutionary, husband of Amalie Hofer
Johanna Hofer (1896–1988), German film actress
Johannes Hofer (1983), Italian luger
Karl Hofer (1878–1955), German expressionist painter
Lukas Hofer (born 1989), Italian biathlete
Maria Hofer (1894–1977), Austrian organist, pianist and composer
Miklós Hofer (born 1931),  Hungarian architect
Norbert Hofer (born 1971), Austrian politician (FPÖ)
Othmar Hofer, Austrian luger who competed in the early 1970s
Paul Hofer (ice hockey) (born 1928), Swiss ice hockey player
Paul Hofer (born 1952), former professional American football player
Polo Hofer (born 1945), Swiss musician
Ralph K. Hofer (1921–1944), U.S. fighter pilot
Simon Hofer (born 1981), Swiss footballer
Stefan Hofer, Swiss curler
Walter Hofer (1893–c. 1971), German art dealer

See also
Hoffa (disambiguation)
Surnames of South Tyrolean origin

German-language surnames
German toponymic surnames